Giovanni Bonati may refer to:

 Giuseppe Bonati (1635–1681), also known as Giovanni Bonatti, Italian painter of the Baroque period
 Giovanni Bonati (motorcycle racer) (born 1991), Italian Grand Prix motorcycle racer
 Giovanni Bonati (gymnast), represented Italy in the 1908 Summer Olympics men's team